Huntwicke,  located in Topsfield, Massachusetts, is the former property of William A. Coolidge, a lawyer, financier, and art collector.  Encompassing , it includes a 24-room Georgian-style mansion designed by architect Phillip Richardson in 1921 for John L. Saltonstall, other buildings, and landscaping by the firm of Frederick Law Olmsted.  The brick mansion includes 14 bedrooms, six fireplaces, parquet floors, hand-carved wood paneling from the 1790 Nathaniel Saltonstall house in Haverhill, and extensive  gardens.  When Coolidge died in 1992, The Massachusetts Institute of Technology inherited the property.  In 2000,  MIT and the Essex County Greenbelt Association, a conservation organization and private, non-profit land trust, concluded an agreement to restrict further development, and the former estate, which includes over a mile of land along the Ipswich River,  is now one of the largest conservation areas in private hands in Massachusetts.

References
 http://web.mit.edu/newsoffice/2000/topsfield.html
 http://tech.mit.edu/V120/N53/estate.53n.html

Protected areas of Essex County, Massachusetts
Houses in Topsfield, Massachusetts
Open space reserves of Massachusetts